Cruzan can mean:

 The alternate spelling of Crucian:
 a native of St. Croix, U.S. Virgin Islands
 the native dialect spoken on that island, also known as Virgin Islands Creole
 Cruzan Rum, a rum produced on St. Croix, U.S. Virgin Islands
 Nancy Cruzan, a key figure in the right-to-die movement
 Cruzan Amphitheatre, a 19,000-seat open-air music venue in West Palm Beach, Florida

Language and nationality disambiguation pages